Matthew Graham George Thaddeus Taylor (born 1973) is a British astrophysicist employed by the European Space Agency. He is best known to the public for his involvement in the landing on Comet 67P/Churyumov–Gerasimenko by the Rosetta mission (European Space Agency)'s Philae lander, which was the first spacecraft to land on a comet nucleus. He is Project Scientist of the Rosetta mission.

Early life 
Taylor was born in Manor Park, London in 1973. He is the son of a bricklayer and worked alongside his father, on building sites, during his summer breaks from university.

Education 
Taylor received a degree in physics from the University of Liverpool.
Taylor earned a PhD in space physics which focused on Magnetohydrodynamics modelling of astrophysical plasma in the magnetosphere from Imperial College London.

Career
Taylor's research career began when he became a research fellow at the Mullard Space Science Laboratory working on the Cluster mission. This position led to his appointment as Cluster project scientist in 2005. He is an author on 70 publications, primarily on the topic of aurorae. In summer 2013, Taylor became a Project Scientist for the Rosetta mission. Taylor's research has been published in leading peer reviewed scientific journals including Nature, the Journal of Geophysical Research, Geophysical Research Letters and the Annales Geophysicae.

Personal life
Taylor's wife is Leanne. They have two children.

Taylor is a devoted fan of heavy metal, especially death metal. He has posed with David Vincent of Morbid Angel for the magazine Metal Hammer, as well as having been photographed wearing Cannibal Corpse shirts multiple times. He wrote the foreword to David Vincent's biography I Am Morbid: Ten Lessons Learned From Extreme Metal, Outlaw Country, And The Power Of Self-Determination.

Taylor has a tattoo of the Rosetta spacecraft and its lander Philae on his leg, which he had tattooed after the spacecraft was successfully awoken from hibernation in 2014.

References

External links

 Matt Taylor at ESA
 
 Matt Taylor at Jet Propulsion Laboratory

1973 births
Living people
Alumni of Imperial College London
Alumni of the University of Liverpool
British scientists
European Space Agency personnel
Rosetta mission